Syfy is a German pay television channel, launched on 1 September 2003. It was the third Sci Fi Channel to be launched, following the US and U.K. versions. From 2003 until 2010, it was known as the Sci-Fi channel.

Programming

Aftermath (2017–present)
Agents of S.H.I.E.L.D. (Marvel's Agents of S.H.I.E.L.D.) (2017–present)
Alphas (2013-2016)
Battlestar Galactica (1978) (2003-2007, 2010-2012)
Battlestar Galactica (2004) (2004, 2007-2009, 2011-2013)
Battlestar Galactica: Blood & Chrome (2016–present)
Bionic Woman (2010-2012)
Blood Drive (2018–present)
Dark Matter (2015–present)
Defiance (2013-2016)
Doctor Who (2008-2011)
Dominion (2016–present)
Earth 2 (2005-2007)
Eureka (EUReKA - Die geheime Stadt) (2009–2014)
Fantasy Island (2007-2009)
Farscape (Farscape - Verschollen im All)
From the Earth to the Moon (2006-2007)
Godzilla: The Series (Godzilla - Die Serie)
Haven (2010–present)
Helix (2014-2016)
Heroes Reborn (2015-2016)
Incorporated (2017–present)
Killjoys (2016–present)
Krypton (2018–present)
Lavalantula (2016–present)
Legend Quest (2012–present)
Lexx: The Dark Zone Stories
Lost Girl (2016–present)
Marvel's Agent Carter (2015–present)
Marvel's Runaways (2018–present)
Psi Factor: Chronicles of the Paranormal (Psi-Faktor - Es geschieht jeden Tag)
Quantum Leap (Zurück in die Vergangenheit)
The Invisible Man (Invisible Man - Der Unsichtbare)
The Powers of Matthew Star (Der Junge vom anderen Stern)
Saber Rider and the Star Sheriffs
The Six Million Dollar Man (Der Sechs-Millionen-Dollar-Mann)
Spider-Man (Spiderman)
Stargate Atlantis (2008–present)
Stargate SG-1 (Stargate Kommando SG-1)
Star Trek: Deep Space Nine
Star Trek: The Next Generation (Raumschiff Enterprise - Das nächste Jahrhundert)
Star Trek (Raumschiff Enterprise)
Star Trek: Voyager (Star Trek: Raumschiff Voyager)
Star Wars: The Clone Wars (2016–present)
TekWar (TekWar - Krieger der Zukunft)
The Bionic Woman (Die Sieben-Millionen-Dollar-Frau) (2007-2009)
The Outer Limits (Outer Limits - Die unbekannte Dimension)
The Shannara Chronicles (2017–present)
The Six Million Dollar Man (Der 6-Millionen-Dollar-Mann) (2004-2007)
Torchwood (2015-2016)
Warehouse 13 (2010–2015)
Z Nation (2015–present)

Audience share

Germany

References

External links
 

Syfy
Television stations in Germany
Television stations in Austria
Television stations in Switzerland
German-language television stations
Mass media in Munich
Television channels and stations established in 2003
2003 establishments in Germany
Science fiction television channels